Ukhwa is a village located in Araria district of Indian state of Bihar.

References

India